Idaea pallidata  is a moth of the family Geometridae. It is found from northern and central Europe to the Caucasus, central Asia and the Amur Region.

The wingspan is 18–20 mm for males and 16–19 mm for females. The adults fly in one generation from mid May to late June. . They are attracted to light.

The larvae feed on withered or dry leaves of various herbaceous plants such as Achillea millefolium, Valeriana officinalis, Filipendula ulmaria and Vaccinium myrtillus.

Notes
The flight season refers to Belgium. This may vary in other parts of the range.

External links

Fauna Europaea
Lepiforum.de

Sterrhini
Moths of Europe
Moths of Asia
Moths described in 1775
Taxa named by Michael Denis
Taxa named by Ignaz Schiffermüller